DD North-East previously known as DD-13 is a state owned TV channel telecasting from Doordarshan Kendra in Guwahati, Agartala, Kohima, Imphal, Jorhat, Silchar, Dibrugarh, Tura, Aizawl, Itanagar and Shillong. On 4 August 2019 a particular 24x7 Doordarshan channel relaunched for Assam state named as DD Assam & it replaced DD North East & the channel was launched by Minister of Information & Broadcasting  Shri Prakash Javadekar Ji through virtual event & CEO of Prasar Bharati Mr. Shashi Shekhar Vempati & other top levels of Doordarshan was present on the event. The event was also live telecasted on 11:00 A.M. at DD News DD National DD India DD Bharati & other North East DD channels
The programmes are produced at Doordarshan studios in Guwahati, Agartala, Kohima, Imphal, Silchar, Dibrugarh, Tura, Aizawl, Itanagar, Shillong and Gangtok for DD North East.

History
DD North East Channel is a composite satellite television service for the North Eastern states of India broadcasting programmes in Assamese, English and other languages and dialects of the North East region. The programmes are a mix including entertainment programmes, informative programmes, social programmes, news and current affairs, art and culture. The first Assamese news transmission was introduced by the channel on 15 March 1991.  2 December 2019 Name Change to DD Assam

Programmes

 Axomiya Batori
 English News
 Krisi Darsan
 Krirangan
 Yuva Darpan
 Dhun Dhamaka

References

External links 
 Doordarshan's Official website 
 Doordarshan news site 
 An article at PFC

 

Doordarshan
Foreign television channels broadcasting in the United Kingdom
Television channels and stations established in 1994
Television stations in Guwahati
Indian direct broadcast satellite services
Mass media in Assam
1994 establishments in Assam